N’arweet Carolyn Briggs  is a Yaluk-ut Weelam and Boon Wurrung elder, and the Boon Wurrung representative in the City of Port Phillip. She is the founder and chair of the Boon Wurrung Foundation. She was awarded the National Aboriginal Elder of the Year in 2011 by the National NAIDOC Committee. She was inducted into the Victorian Honour Roll of Women in 2005. She was awarded a Member of the Order of Australia (AM) as part of the 2019 Queen’s Birthday Honours list.

Biography
Briggs is the great-granddaughter of Louisa Briggs, who as a child was abducted by seal hunters before later returning to the Kulin nation with her husband, John Briggs, who also survived abduction. Briggs was born in Melbourne.

She first attended Monash University in the 1970s, and completed her Doctorate in Philosophy (Media and Communications) at RMIT University in 2020. In the 1970s, she opened the first Aboriginal child care service in the Dandenong Ranges.

In 2005, she established the Boon Wurrung Foundation, to conduct cultural research, including for the restoration of the Boon Wurrung language.

References

Indigenous Australians in Victoria (Australia)
Victoria (Australia) local councillors
Living people
Year of birth missing (living people)
Members of the Order of Australia
Women local councillors in Australia